Danuta Elizabeth Wasserman is a professor of psychiatry and suicidology at Karolinska Institutet in Sweden. She is a public mental health and medical educator.

Early life 
Wasserman was born in Warsaw, Poland to Nikolai Stefan and Stefania Maria (nee Smolarek) Wolk. Wasserman migrated to Sweden in 1968, where she now permanently resides in Stockholm.

Education 
Wasserman completed a Bachelor of Medicine and a Bachelor of Arts in psychology in 1968 at Jagiellonian University in Kraków, Poland. She continued her medical studies in Sweden and in 1972 obtained a Clinical Medical Degree from Uppsala University. In 1979, Wasserman became registered as a specialist in General Psychiatry by the Swedish National Board of Health and Social Affairs.  Wasserman defended her PhD thesis in 1986 on “Attempted suicide – the patient’s family, social network and therapy” at Karolinska Institutet. In 1989, Wasserman concluded her psychoanalytic training at the Swedish Psychoanalytical Institute.

Career 
Wasserman founded and became the head of the National Swedish Centre for Suicide Research and Prevention of Mental Ill-Health (NASP) in 1993. In this role, Wasserman has contributed to national suicide prevention strategies in Sweden. In 1990, Wasserman became an Associate Professor at Karolinska Insititutet. In 1995, she became a Professor in suicide prevention at the National Institute for Psychosocial Medicine, and in 2002 she became a Professor in psychiatry and suicidology at Karolinska Institutet. Between 2002 - 2007, Wasserman was the head of the Public Health Sciences department at Karolinska Institutet. She is presently the head of NASP, and the director of World Health Organization’s (WHO) Lead Collaborating Centre for Research, Methods, Development and Training in Suicide Prevention.  

In 1993, Wasserman founded, and has since been the head of, the National Centre for Suicide Research and Prevention of Mental Ill-Health (NASP) located in Stockholm. Since 1997, Wasserman has been the director for the World Health Organization’s (WHO) Lead Collaborating Centre for Research, Methods, Development and Training in Suicide Prevention. In 2020, Wasserman became the President-Elect of the World Psychiatric Association.

Research 
Wasserman’s research integrates social, psychiatric and genetic aspects and is oriented towards the prevention of mental health problems and suicide.

Selected publications 

</ref>

Honors and awards 
In 2005, Wasserman received the annual research award from the American Foundation for Suicide Research. In 2021 she received the Morselli Medal from the International Academy for Suicide Research, and in 2022 she received the Pascal-Boyle Prize for outstanding achievement by a woman working to improve mental health care in Europe.

Notes

References

External links

Living people

Year of birth missing (living people)